Jean de Lacoste (1730–1820) was a lawyer in the parliament of Bordeaux who became chief clerk of the Navy, on the eve of the Revolution. 

He was sent to the Caribbean to retain control for the new colonial regime.  He was Minister of the Navy from 15 March 1792 to 10 July 1792. He was indicted by the court's criminal department, which acquitted him.  After the coup of 18 Brumaire Year VIII (9 November 1799), he was appointed member of the council and retained office until the abolition of it in 1814.

1730 births
1820 deaths
Ministers of Marine and the Colonies